Adesmus bisellatus is a species of beetle in the family Cerambycidae. It was described by Bates in 1881. It is known from Colombia and Ecuador.

References

Adesmus
Beetles described in 1881